Banksia Creek is a watercourse in Victoria. The name refers to the plant genus Banksia, which grows in the area.

References
 

West Gippsland catchment
Rivers of Gippsland (region)